Battle of the Blues may refer to:

 Battle of the Blues (boat race), an annual rowing race between the Cambridge University Boat Club and Oxford University Boat Club
 The Battle of the Blues, an annual cricket match between Royal College, Colombo and S. Thomas' College, Mount Lavinia, played since 1879 
 Battle of the Blues (Matara), an annual cricket match between St. Thomas' College and St. Servatius' College, Matara, played since 1900
 Battle of the Blues (Kandy), an annual cricket match between Trinity College, Kandy and St. Anthony's College, Kandy, played since 1914
 Battle of the Blues (North Carolina), an annual sporting competition between Duke Blue Devils and North Carolina Tar Heels
 Battle of the Blues, an album by Jimmy Witherspoon
 Battle of the Blue, an annual college football rivalry game between the University of Delaware Fightin' Blue Hens and Villanova University Wildcats